The Darlington Trail is a hiking trail of  in south-central Pennsylvania. Its western end is at a junction with the Tuscarora Trail and the Appalachian Trail. Its eastern end is northwest of Harrisburg at Tower Road, which is only accessible for rugged vehicles.

History and route 
The Darlington Trail predates the Appalachian Trail, and was founded in 1908 by the former Pennsylvania Alpine Club. It was named for the secretary of the club, Bishop Darlington of St. Stephen's Cathedral in Harrisburg. The trail was originally much longer, reaching from near Chambersburg in the southwest to a vista over the Susquehanna River at its northeastern end. The trail was adopted by the Susquehanna Appalachian Trail Club in 1954, after it had mostly deteriorated. A portion of the original route was later incorporated into the Appalachian Trail. Near the trail's present western end, Darlington Shelter is commonly used by hikers on the Tuscarora and Appalachian Trails. The Darlington Trail also features two evenly-spaced camping shelters of its own at Millers Gap and Lambs Gap.

References

Hiking trails in Pennsylvania
1908 establishments in Pennsylvania